Kim MacQuarrie is an author, documentary filmmaker, anthropologist, and conservationist whose works include the best-selling The Last Days of the Incas (2007) and The Living Edens. His documentary film work has brought him 4 national Emmy awards.

MacQuarrie is known for his fine narrative treatments of the history of indigenous cultures, such as the fall of the Inca Empire, as well as his work in conservation. He has published five books and his work has appeared in worldwide publications such as The Guardian, The Christian Science Monitor and National Geographic Traveller. He has produced and or directed dozens of documentaries for television channels such as Discovery Channel,  PBS, FX, Fox and others.

Biography

Personal life
MacQuarrie was born in Los Angeles and attended Valley High School in Las Vegas, Nevada. As an undergraduate, he studied abroad in
Paris for a year and a half. As a graduate student, he studied abroad in Lima, Peru for a year at the Universidad Católica and lived in that country for four years. His life partner is Ciara Byrne.

Writing career

MacQuarrie's first book, Peru's Amazonian Eden: Manu National Park and Biosphere Reserve (1992), covers the flora, fauna, history and anthropology of Manú National Park, the largest and most species-rich protected area to be found anywhere on Earth.

His second book, Gold of the Andes (2 Vol. Set): The Llamas, Alpacas, Vicuñas and Guanacos of South America (1994), gives a thorough accounting of the importance llamas, alpacas, vicuñas and guanacos have had on South American cultures.

MacQuarrie’s third book, Where the ANDES meet the AMAZON: Peru & Bolivia's Bahuaja Sonene & Madidi National Parks (2001) chronicles the history, indigenous cultures, and flora and fauna of the largest bi-national protected rainforest area in the world.

MacQuarrie's fourth book, The Last Days of the Incas (2007), covers the Inca Empire, its conquest by Francisco Pizarro and the Spanish conquistadors, and the massive Inca rebellion that lasted nearly four decades after the initial conquest.

MacQuarrie’s fifth book, Life and Death in the Andes: On the Trail of Bandits, Heroes, and Revolutionaries (2015),  chronicles his 4,300-mile journey from Colombia to Tierra del Fuego.

Television

In 2013, FX (TV channel) announced plans to turn MacQuarrie’s Last Days of the Incas into a 13-part dramatic television series, called Conquistadors.

Philanthropy
MacQuarrie is the cofounder of the 501(c)3 nonprofit conservation organization Green our Planet, headquartered in Las Vegas, Nevada. Launched in March, 2013, the foundation operates a free crowdfunding platform for green projects around the world and also runs the one of the fastest-growing school garden programs in the United States in Las Vegas,

Filmography

Written works

References

External links
 Green Our Planet
 Simon & Schuster Publisher's author page
 MacQuarrie's Guardian Column Archive
 
 
 Book TV interview with MacQuarrie on The Last Days of the Incas, JUNE 22, 2007.

Living people
The Guardian journalists
Year of birth missing (living people)